WCSY-FM (103.7 MHz) is a radio station broadcasting a classic hits format. Licensed to South Haven, Michigan, the station serves the Benton Harbor-Saint Joseph area.

WCSY-FM has filed a construction permit to move its community of license from Hartford, Michigan to South Haven, Michigan; it was granted in February 2008. On January 7, 2008, the station changed its branding to "103.7 Cosy-FM". The WCSY call letters were moved to the 103.7 FM frequency from 98.3 on January 17, 2008, which in turn changed call letters to WCXT-FM. The call sign was modified to "WCSY-FM" on November 10, 2008.

Old logo

Sources
Michiguide.com - WCSY-FM History

External links

CSY-FM
Classic hits radio stations in the United States
Radio stations established in 1993
1993 establishments in Michigan